The 2019 Mallorca Open was a women's tennis tournament played on grass courts. It was the 4th edition of the Mallorca Open, and part of the International category of the 2019 WTA Tour. It took place at Santa Ponsa Tennis Club in Mallorca, Spain, from 17 June through 23 June 2019.

Points and prize money

Point distribution

Prize money

WTA singles main draw entrants

Seeds

 1 Rankings are as of June 10, 2019.

Other entrants
The following players received wildcards into the main draw:
  Paula Badosa
  Andrea Petkovic
  Maria Sharapova
  Samantha Stosur

The following players received entry using a protected ranking into the main draw:
  Anna-Lena Friedsam

The following players received entry from the qualifying draw:
  Ysaline Bonaventure  
  Kaja Juvan  
  Varvara Lepchenko 
  Tereza Martincová 
  Shelby Rogers  
  Sara Sorribes Tormo

Retirements
  Ons Jabeur (right shoulder injury)
  Shelby Rogers (right shoulder injury)

WTA doubles main draw entrants

Seeds

1 Rankings are as of 10 June 2019.

Other entrants 
The following pairs received wildcards into the doubles main draw:
  Mona Barthel /  Anna-Lena Friedsam 
  Aliona Bolsova  /  Wang Yafan

Champions

Singles 

  Sofia Kenin def.  Belinda Bencic, 6–7(2–7), 7–6(7–5), 6–4

Doubles 

  Kirsten Flipkens /  Johanna Larsson def.  María José Martínez Sánchez /  Sara Sorribes Tormo, 6–2, 6–4

References

External links 
 

Mallorca Open
Mallorca Open
2019
Mallorca Open